An American Girl: Saige Paints the Sky (2013) is the seventh film in the American Girl series, introducing newcomer Sidney Fullmer in the title role, as well as Kerr Smith, Jane Seymour, Alex Peters, Alana Gordillo and Mika Abdalla.

The film tells the story of Saige Copeland, an aspiring young artist from Albuquerque, New Mexico. As with the previous film, the screenplay was written by Jessica O'Toole and Amy Rardin. The movie was directed by Vince Marcello.

A screening of the film was held at the KiMo Theatre in Albuquerque.

Plot

Nine-year-old artist Saige Copeland begins her first day of fourth grade in Albuquerque, New Mexico, only to learn that the art class has been dropped from the school's curriculum due to budget cuts, replacing it with music. Saige's best friend Tessa Joblansky, a musician, befriended another girl named Dylan Patterson in camp and hangs out with her instead of Saige, making Saige jealous.  A new girl in school named Gabi Peña, who is also an artist, becomes friends with Saige.

Saige tells her grandmother, whom she calls Mimi, about the situation, and Mimi proposes a school-wide protest against the decision. Tessa goes to Mimi's house with Saige instead of going to Dylan's house. At the same time, Gabi invites Saige to her house, but Saige turns her down, saying she is busy.

Later, as Saige is telling her grandmother about Tessa and her other friends, Mimi trips over Saige's dog, Rembrandt, and breaks her leg and wrist. She is then hospitalized due to her injuries. At the hospital, she begs Saige to continue on with her protest. Saige agrees, and promises to do so for her grandmother.

At school, Saige, Tessa, Gabi and Dylan discuss plans on staging the protest, with Saige coming up with "A Day of Beige" after her visit to the hospital. Dylan suggests a press conference in order to gain more attention since her mother works as a news reporter, to which Saige reluctantly agrees. The demonstrations are held as planned with all of the students wearing beige in protest, but is nearly put to a halt as Saige and her friends are summoned to the principal's office to explain the situation. After a bit of a talk, Principal Laird gives the girls the permission to hold a press conference. The conference takes place, but upon being interviewed, Saige is overwhelmed with stage fright, and Dylan answers the reporters' questions in her place.

Principal Laird later tells the girls that there aren't any more funds to hire an art teacher, and that they would need to earn $5,000 in six weeks for the art class to start. Mimi suggests a fund drive to be held at the Albuquerque International Balloon Fiesta, and to have her granddaughter lead the parade in her place as she may not make it in time for the event. Saige worries that she might freak out in front of people, but her father assures her that it will be alright. The four girls take up various odd jobs to earn funds only to be unsuccessful. Dylan suggests a concert at the fiesta, but Saige has doubts about it.

Later at the ranch, Saige and her horse Picasso do a practice run for the parade, but Saige is  frustrated as she can't concentrate on the ride. Saige and Gabi are worried that Dylan and Tessa's part for the fundraiser is getting more attention than theirs, and the two agreed to come at Mimi's ranch to further discuss on the matter. Saige and Picasso do another run at the ranch, this time with success as they manage to pull off a gait without being distracted.

The four girls talk about combining their efforts in the fundraiser. Dylan and Tessa argue that they have their plans already set for their part, but Saige disagrees, leading to a confrontation. Saige then tells Tessa that the Tessa she knows would agree with her before flying into a rage against Dylan and accuses her of stealing the spotlight over her efforts, for which she is rejected by Tessa.

Saige tries to talk Mimi into doing artwork, but Mimi says that she can't do things as she did before. Saige suggests coming to the parade but Mimi says that she's not up for it. Saige gets upset and confesses that the arrangements are worse than she has been admitting, but also that the Mimi she knows wouldn't give up, before running off.

Another practice run with Picasso takes place, but when her parents and Gabi show up, Saige is too frustrated to continue, and worries that the fiesta is going to be a disaster. Gabi quickly leaves because Saige says she wanted things to be the same as the year before.

Saige then joins her father on a hot air balloon ride. She later reconciles with Gabi, and apologizes to Mimi about how she got mad at how things turned out. After her horse practice with Luis, Saige goes to Mimi's studio and decides to paint over her horse painting with a painting knife, turning it into an abstract work. Tessa later sees it, and compliments Saige for what she did. Both Saige and Tessa admit to their mistake, reconcile, and agree to work together for the fiesta. Saige also makes amends with Dylan, with the latter apologizing over how she was taking over Saige's fundraiser.

With the Balloon Fiesta taking place, Saige leads the parade in front of onlookers. She is nervous at first, but she eventually overcomes her fears as she performs the scarf trick. The girls later come up with the joint fund-raising art exhibit and concert as previously planned. The show is a success, but the girls are several dollars short of the $5,000 goal. Saige then makes a speech in front of the audience telling them about how important art is to her and to others. It was enough for some extra money to be put into the fundraiser from the audience, the donation goal is reached and with the art program being reinstated the girls rejoice over the news.

Back at the hot air balloon show, Saige, Tessa, Gabi, and Dylan (now all best friends) all ride a hot air balloon Saige designed as the film ends.

Cast
 Sidney Fullmer as Saige Copeland, a 9-year-old girl who has a passion for art. Although she is very good at what she loves, she has major stage fright.
 Jane Seymour as Miriam "Mimi" Copeland, Saige's paternal grandmother who also has a passion for art. She is the one who inspired Saige to become an artist. 
 Alex Peters as Tessa Jablonsky, Saige's best friend since kindergarten who loves music. Over the summer, she went to music camp, and had gotten closer with Dylan.
 Alana Gordillo as Gabi Peña, a new girl in town who quickly becomes close friends with Saige. She also loves art, but aside from that, she is a big animal-lover.
 Mika Abdalla as Dylan Patterson, Tessa's bossy new friend whom she met at music camp. She also loves music and is an incredible singer and songwriter.
 Kerr Smith as David Copeland, Saige's father who is a pilot. One of his main hobbies is flying hot air balloons.
 Rebecca Gibson as Principal Laird, the principal of Mesa Grande Elementary School. Even though the school can't afford it, she agrees that art and music are very important.
 Laurel Harris as Marina Copeland, Saige's mother who is a math professor at a local university. She is very supportive of Saige's fight to get the art program back.
 Omar Paz Trujillo as Luis, Mimi's neighbor who loves riding horses. He enjoys riding with Saige and teaching her new skills.

Production
An American Girl: Saige Paints the Sky was filmed in New Mexico, USA and Winnipeg, Manitoba, Canada.

Release
The film aired on NBC on July 13, 2013. It was released on DVD + Blu-ray on July 2, 2013.

References

External links
 
 An American Girl: Saige Paints the Sky

2013 television films
2013 films
Films based on American novels
Films about fictional painters
Films about horses
Films set in New Mexico
Films shot in Winnipeg
American children's films
Saige Paints the Sky
Universal Pictures direct-to-video films
Films directed by Vince Marcello
2010s English-language films
2010s American films